The 1984 European Figure Skating Championships was a senior-level international competition held in Budapest, Hungary. Elite skaters from European ISU member nations competed in the disciplines of men's singles, ladies' singles, pair skating, and ice dancing.

Results

Men

Ladies

Pairs

Ice dancing

References

External links
 results

European Figure Skating Championships, 1984
European Figure Skating Championships, 1984
European Figure Skating Championships
International figure skating competitions hosted by Hungary
International sports competitions in Budapest
1980s in Budapest